Mitko Stojkovski (born 18 December 1972) is a Macedonian former professional footballer who played as a defender.

Club career
Stojkovski started his career playing with his home town club FK Pelister, back then playing in the Yugoslav Second League. In 1991 his skills were noted and he moves to the 1991 European Champions Red Star Belgrade where he stayed four seasons and played over 120 games. In the legendary 100th eternal derby against their greatest rivals Partizan, he scored and was named the man of the match. In 1995, he signed with Spanish La Liga club Real Oviedo where he played 67 league matches in two seasons with the side. In 1998 VfB Stuttgart signed him and he was part of the team that reached the 1998 UEFA Cup Winners' Cup Final where they lost against Chelsea. After two and a half years in Germany, he returned to Pelister where he retired in 2001 by winning the Macedonian Cup that year.

After retiring, for a period he was a sports director at FK Pelister.

International career
Stojkovski made his debut for the Macedonia national team in a March 1994 friendly match against Slovenia, he has earned 28 caps, scoring 5 goals in total. His final international was a November 2002 friendly against Israel.

Honours
Red Star
 Yugoslav First League and First League of FR Yugoslavia: 1991–92, 1994–95
 FR Yugoslav Cup: 1992–93, 1994–95

Stuttgart
 German League Cup runner-up: 1998
 UEFA Cup Winners' Cup runner-up: 1997–98

Pelister
 Macedonian Cup: 2001

References

External links
 Profile at Macedonian Football 
 
 
 

1972 births
Living people
Sportspeople from Bitola
Association football defenders
Yugoslav footballers
Macedonian footballers
North Macedonia international footballers
FK Pelister players
Red Star Belgrade footballers
Real Oviedo players
VfB Stuttgart players
Yugoslav Second League players
Yugoslav First League players
La Liga players
Bundesliga players
Macedonian First Football League players
Macedonian expatriate footballers
Expatriate footballers in Serbia and Montenegro
Macedonian expatriate sportspeople in Serbia and Montenegro
Expatriate footballers in Germany
Macedonian expatriate sportspeople in Germany
Expatriate footballers in Spain
Macedonian expatriate sportspeople in Spain